Portage Township was one of the sixteen original townships in Summit County, Ohio.  It was located in the middle of Summit County and included the cities/towns Akron and Cuyahoga Falls and an earlier part of Middlebury. Eventually, the township was absorbed by Akron and Cuyahoga Falls and ceased to exist.
The township derived its name from the Portage Path, which extends north to south through the middle of the township.

Geography
Portage Township lays between the other original townships of Copley, Northampton, Tallmadge, and Coventry. In time, several villages were established within Portage, including the village of Middlebury in the southeast, Akron in the south and Cuyahoga Falls in the northeast.

History

The first white settler who settled in Portage was Major Miner Spicer in 1810, in "Spicertown", now located at the corner of Spicer and Carroll streets Ohio. The township was formally organized at a meeting held in the house of Warren H. Clark in 1838 with first offer:

 Trustees: Wm. B. Mitchell, Simon Perkins, Jr., George Babcock; Clerk, Horace K. Smith
 Treasurer, Samuel A. Wheeler.

In the early days, Portage Township was sparsely populated. Most of the land was titled to one landholder, Simon Perkins, and the land was not easily arable due to variable terrain.

The history of Portage Township is challenging to reconstruct since it is often considered as an appendage to the town of Akron.

Counties
Portage Township's land has been in the following counties:

References

 Author unknown, (1999-2005). County Formation Maps. Retrieved May 2, 2005.
 Grant, C.R., Findley, A.I.; (1891). Illustrated Summit County, Ohio (1992 reprint).  Hudson, Ohio: Hudson Genealogical Study Group.

Geography of Summit County, Ohio
Defunct townships in Ohio